Teddy Harvia is the pen name of David Thayer, an American science fiction fan artist. "Teddy Harvia" is an anagram of "David Thayer". He was born in Oklahoma but grew up in and resides in Dallas, Texas.

, Teddy Harvia has won the Hugo Award for Best Fan Artist four times, and has been nominated an additional sixteen times for the award. For his service to Southern science fiction fandom, Harvia was presented the Rebel Award by the Southern Fandom Confederation in 1997 at that year's DeepSouthCon.

David Thayer was chair of the bid to host the Worldcon in Cancún, Mexico, in 2003. (The bid lost to Torcon III and the 61st World Science Fiction Convention was held in Toronto.)

References

External links
Teddy Harvia (official site)

Hugo Award-winning artists
Living people
Year of birth missing (living people)
Artists from Oklahoma